John Allen Gable (1943 – February 2005) was executive director of the Theodore Roosevelt Association from 1974 to his death in 2005. He was widely considered the world's leading authority on Theodore Roosevelt.

Biography
Born in Massachusetts in 1943, Gable graduated from Lenox School for Boys in 1961 and Kenyon College in 1965. He received a Ph.D. in History from Brown University in 1972. Thereafter he held adjunct positions in the history departments of C.W. Post/Long Island University, Briarcliff College, Brown University, and Hofstra University.

Gable's publications include The Bull Moose Years: Theodore Roosevelt and the Progressive Party (Port Washington, NY: Kennikat Press, 1978). In 1975 he founded the quarterly Theodore Roosevelt Association Journal. Gable served as consultant and on-screen commentator for numerous television productions concerning Theodore Roosevelt. He also served on the vestry of Christ Church (Oyster Bay), was a past-trustee of the Oyster Bay Historical Society, held a seat on the Theodore Roosevelt Memorial Committee at the American Museum of Natural History, and was a member of the Advisory Board for the Roosevelt Study Center in The Netherlands.

Shortly before his death, Gable was awarded the Theodore Roosevelt Association's Distinguished Service Medal.

External links
Oyster Bay Enterprise Pilot Obituary for John A. Gable
Theodore Roosevelt Association
Dr. John Gable - How Roosevelt's Presidential Order To Fix Spelling Helped Kill Spelling Reform

American male biographers
20th-century American historians
American male non-fiction writers
Theodore Roosevelt
1943 births
2005 deaths
Kenyon College alumni
Brown University alumni
20th-century American biographers
20th-century American male writers